"Ritmo de la noche" (Rhythm of the Night) is a song written by AC Beat, Lagonda, Castioni, and Wycombe, and originally recorded by German house group Chocolate in 1990. It was covered and released in the same year by Mystic, The Sacados, Lorca, and ten other producers.

Background
The opening piano riff of the song was sampled from "I Go to Rio" by Australian artist Peter Allen.

Track listing
CD maxi
 "Ritmo de la noche" (Brazilmix) - 5:11	
 "Ritmo de la noche" (Single-Edit) - 3:37	
 "Ritmo de la noche" (New Age House-Mix) - 5:56

7" single
 "Ritmo de la noche" (Single-Edit) - 3:37	
 "Ritmo de la noche" (New Age Edit) - 3:55

Charts

Weekly charts

Year-end charts

Lorca version

In 1990, French house group Lorca covered the song and it reached number-one in Belgium and peaked in the top 30 in France and the Netherlands.

Track listing
 "Ritmo de la noche" (Radio Mix) - 3:48
 "Ritmo de la noche" (Sun Maxi Mix) - 6:17
 "Come On" - 5:06

Charts

Mystic version

In 1990, German house group Mystic covered the song and reached number 2 in Spain and the top 30 in the Netherlands.

Track listing
 "Ritmo de la noche" (Radio Mix) - 3:51	
 "Ritmo de la noche" (Club Edit) - 3:03

Charts

Other versions 
In 1990, Argentine group The Sacados covered the song. Unlike original version, this added a rap-style letter. It was used as open tune for  Telefe program Ritmo de la Noche.

References

1990 songs
1990 singles
Tropical house songs
Eurodance songs
Dance-pop songs